Edward Hope Kirkby (31 December 1853 – 28 July 1915) was a jeweler watchmaker in Williamstown, Victoria who eventually became a manufacturing electrician making systems of fire protection. He is best known for his early X-ray experiments and later wireless experiments, among the earliest in Australia.  He experimented on his own account and together with George Augustine Taylor. There are no primary references to George Taylor experimenting with wireless telegraphy himself. Kirkby was the technical genius behind Father Shaw and his Australian Wireless Company.

Early life and family
Edward Hope Kirkby was born on New Year's Eve 1853 on the Ship “Hope” 16 days out of Port Phillip, Melbourne, Victoria, Australia. His father, George Williams Kirkby, was migrating to Australia with his second wife, Charlotte Augusta Collins, and his three sons from his first wife, Eliza Kempson, who had died in childbirth. The voyage was to take 100 days. The family settled in Sandhurst Victoria, later renamed Bendigo. George was to take up business as a cordial, soft drink manufacturer supplying the miners in the gold fields. These were tumultulous times on the gold fields, with the Eureka Stockade rebellion occurring later in 1854 as the miners rose up in protest at the cost of licences. A further five siblings were born here.

It was here that Edward took up his profession of Jeweller watchmaker. His later interest in fire protection may have occurred when he witnessed the burning down of the Beehive building, home of the Bendigo stock exchange. In the early 1880s he studied electricity and magnetism at the Bendigo school of mines, winning awards and later presenting papers on the subject.

He married Jane Gill in Melbourne, daughter of the farrier Jonathan Gill of the old forge in Mt Alexander Rd, Ascot Vale. They initially settled in Sandhurst, where their first son, Frederick Strauss Kirkby, was born. They moved to Williamstown in 1882–1883, where he set up shop in Nelson Place. A further three sons were born here to Edward and Jane.

He applied for his first patent in 1888 for a timekeeping system for VFA matches. In 1893 he applied for his second patent for a system of street fire alarms incorporating the switchboards and communication equipment associated with these alarms. It was adopted by the Melbourne Fire Brigade and other cities. Thus began his life of invention.

In 1901 he moved from Williamstown to the city, operating as a manufacturing electrician making his systems of fire protection and X-ray apparatus, all the while pursuing his interest in wireless telegraphy.

By 1907 Wormald Bros had become his agent making his systems of fire protection. Dissatisfied with their performance, he moved to Sydney NSW with two of his sons, setting up business in the city manufacturing X-ray and medical apparatus.

Evevtually he had a falling-out with Wormald Bros, who were getting rich at his expense, and they dissolved their partnership. Looking for a place to manufacture his systems of fire protection, he approached his friend Father Archibald Shaw, a Catholic priest in the Order of the Missionaries of the Sacred Heart, the assistant procurator to Father Guis at the orders house in “Ascot” in Dutruc St Randwick to build a factory on land owned by them. They refused and built it themselves and let it to Kirkby, who moved in with his men and tools and began manufacturing his systems of fire protection. Father Shaw knew of his expertise in wireless and asked him to manufacture wireless for him to sell to raise funds for the missions. How lucky was Shaw to have an expert on wireless telegraphy, invention, manufacturing capability experienced in patent application landing on his door step. A gift from heaven answering all his prayers. Sombegan the Shaw Wirless Works or the Randwick Wireless Works.

In 1911, Edward’s wife and the rest of his family moved to Sydney. Kirkby sold out of the works to a new company and moved back to the city. He moved into a house at 1 Burton St, Randwick, where his wife died on 26 July 1915, buried on 27 July, and Edward dropped dead from a heart attack at his place of work on 28 July. They are buried together at Waverley Cemetery.

So ended a life of invention largely unrecognised as biographers of George Taylor and Archibald Shaw claimed all the credit for them for Kirkby’s endeavours.

Professional career
Edward Hope Kirkby was a jeweler watchmaker in Williamstown who eventually became a manufacturing electrician making systems of fire protection, in 1908 he invented and patented the first automatic sprinkler alarm.

X-ray experiments
He is first recorded as experimenting with X-ray in September 1896  This is only 9 months after Roentgen presented his discovery of X-rays. He is reported as experimenting with the medical staff at Williamstown Hospital later that year In 1900 Dr Clenndinnen was party to demonstrating X-ray at Bendigo School of Mines using a Kirkby manufactured X-ray coil, said by him that it was an excellent one. Kirkby eventually moved to Sydney in 1907 where he set up business manufacturing X-ray apparatus and consulting with the medical profession

Wireless experiments
He was first recorded practically demonstrating wireless telegraphy along with X-ray in 1899

He was demonstrating experiments in X-ray and wireless at the Federal Exhibition and Palace of Amusements in 1903 

In early 1905, the use of wireless telegraphy in Europe had increased to the extent that there was much concern by the British Admiralty about mutual interference between neighbouring operators, particularly nearby ships using different transmission systems. This concern was reflected in Australia. The Australian Postmaster-General's Department was not considered a reliable source for comment and an Australian reporter chose to interview Kirkby an expert on the subject. Kirkby correctly identified syntony (as it was then known) or frequency selective transmission and reception as the technological solution to the problem.

Again in January 1905, the highly mobile Kirkby he conducted a demonstration of wireless perhaps better attributed to quackery rather than wireless experimentation, where "on the occasion of the installation of a high frequency electrical apparatus at Elsinore, Glebe Road, Glebe Point. In the darkened room, Mr. Kirkby, who erected the apparatus to the order of Mrs. Clark, showed the visitors the wonders of the high frequency system by which the electric fluid permeates the whole body appearing in jets at all points from the head to the toe of the boot. With all its force the current can be applied to infants, and its curative agency is now established among leading physicians." However later he did undertake some more traditional wireless experiments and we hear no more of such unfortunate diversions.

Kirkby continued to lecture and demonstrate wireless telegraphy and X-rays. In February 1905, at a meeting of the Accountants and Clerks' Association in Melbourne, it was reported: "After the completion of other routine business, Mr. E. H. Kirkby, electrician, was introduced, and delivered a lecture on Some of the Latest Phases of Electrical Science, illustrated by experiments, which included wireless telegraphy, X-rays and other wonders of this science, which were highly appreciated by all present. A vote of thanks to the lecturer concluded the meeting."

In a visit to Adelaide, South Australia in August 1907, a city which was otherwise dormant to wireless telegraphy following the passing of the Wireless Telegraphy Act 1905, Kirkby is reported demonstrating the technology to a local reporter: "At the U.S.A. depot, Gawler-place, yesterday, a representative of "The Advertiser" was shown a complete model of the wireless telegraphic apparatus by the manager, Mr. H. E. Kirby (sic). The instrument is of a kind used on the large Liverpool American mailboats. It consists of a transmitter, and a receiver, fitted with all the necessary parts, including the tapping key, batteries, spark-inductor, coherer, relay electric bell, connecting peg, batteries, connector for Morse writing apparatus, and air wire. The machine works accurately at a distance of 17 to 20 yards, and with more powerful batteries would doubtless transmit messages to a greater distance. Mr. Kirby first of all started the bell ringing on the receiver when the two parts were in the same room, but to demonstrate the principle more fully he carried the receiver into the next shop, a thick wall dividing the rooms, and then operated again, the bell responding to every touch upon the tapping key.

Kirkby participated as an operator of one of the two wireless stations established by Australian land military forces at their annual Easter encampment. Likely some of the equipment had been manufactured by Kirkby. The experiment was widely reported (with apologies for the language of the day): "The present Heathcote camp may be an historical one, since it has witnessed the first recorded successful use of a wireless telegraph installation in the Commonwealth under military conditions. The recent formation of the Wireless Institute enabled Lieut. G. A. Taylor, A.I.C., to make the arrangements in conjunction with Captain Cox-Taylor, of the Garrison Artillery, who watched the experiment closely, and interestedly with a view to the possible future military development of wireless telegraphy in the Commonwealth. Conditions which would most probably be met with on active service were scrupulously observed by those in charge of the operating stations; indeed, in the determination to impart the utmost realism to the undertaking discomforts innumerable were cheerfully faced by the corps. The surrounding district was depended upon for the supply of most of the paraphernalia. For the masts to support the aerials three saplings were lashed together in each instance, giving an altitude of some 50 or 60 feet. The aerial wires at A station were conveyed to a military tent where the operating appliances were installed, and at station B, to a cave under the crest of the hill beneath the line of targets, some four miles to the south-west. The latter position was of very great interest, inasmuch as on the rocks flanking the cave some queer aboriginal carvings and a deep V cut in a sandstone, used evidently by ancient black warriors to sharpen their implements of war, were discovered. A coincidence was actually established between the ancient, barbarous, warlike messages and the most modern means of communication between fighting forces. The outlying station was in charge of Mr. Reginald Wilkinson, and at the main station Mr. Kirkby operated, while the enthusiastic hon. secretary, of the Wireless Institute, Mr. W. H. Hannam, supervised the apparatus. Considerable time was spent in getting connection between the stations, and the call letter V was continually flashing throughout Saturday and Sunday, until it was at last picked up by the head station, in the small hours of Monday morning. Tuning being now consonant, signals were continually exchanged. The University Scouts took deep interest in these experiments, and lent valuable assistance."

Still promoting the patriotic benefits of wireless, in July 1910, Kirkby and Taylor lectured and demonstrated wireless at a meeting of the United Service Institution in Sydney: "Some very interesting experiments were shown last evening by Lieutenant G. A. Taylor and Mr. Kirkby, whose apparatus was commended by Dr. Bell as the equal of any in the world. At the conclusion of a lecture by the former a button was pressed, and by means of wireless a flag was run up, a breeze set blowing, a gun fired, and a gramophone played God Save the King." The lecture was so well received that Taylor and Kirkby responded with a repeat of the lecture and demonstration at King's Hall, Phillip St, Sydney on 31 August 1910, with proceeds going to the Sydney Hospital radium fund.

Taylor only lectured, Kirkby manufactured the equipment and demonstrated it, Taylor was the publisher of the magazine Construction for the Master Builders Association. The only reference to Taylor’s wireless experimentation without any citations or references was by his biographer Giles in 1954. This may have kept Florence, Taylor’s wife, happy as she had commissioned the article that appeared as a supplement to the magazine.

Father Shaw and Australian Wireless Co
Wormalds Bros manufacturers of fire protection equipment were getting rich at his expense. and he dissolved his partnership with them. He was looking for a place to manufacture his apparatus. He was friends with a Catholic priest Father Archibald Shaw MSC. He and his superior, Father Guis, built a factory for Kirkby on their land at the procure where Kirkby began manufacturing his fire systems of fire protection. The procure was always short of money, and Shaw asked Kirkby to make wireless for him. He did and they became very successful, forming a company the Maritime Wireless Company of Australasia.

Personal life

Late life and legacy

References

Artifacts
 Museums Victoria Telegram from Jenvey to Chambers, advising major improvement in signals, 1900 Museums Victoria

Publications
 Jenvey, H. W. Practical telegraphy : a guide for the use of officers of the Victorian Post and Telegraph Department. vol. 1 (2nd edition Melbourne, 1891) Trove

Further reading
 Wikipedia. History of broadcasting in Australia (Brief summary of Kirkby's experiments from this article, places Kirkby in a historical context) 
 Carty, Bruce. Australian Radio History (4th ed. Sydney, 2013) 
 Curnow, Geoffrey Ross. "The history of the development of wireless telegraphy and broadcasting in Australia to 1942, with especial reference to the Australian Broadcasting Commission: a political and administrative study". online
 Encyclopedia of Australian Science. Biography: Kirkby, Edward Hope 
 Jolly, Rhonda. Media ownership and regulation: a chronology (Canberra, 2016) 
 Kirkby, Brian. A little known pioneer of Australian wireless (Amateur Radio, May 2012) 
 National Library of Australia, Trove. Individual summary: Kirkby, Edward Hope (1853-1915) 
 National Library of Australia, Trove. Collection of 300+ articles tagged Edward Hope Kirkby 
 Ross, John F. A History of Radio in South Australia 1897–1977 (J. F. Ross, 1978) 
 Ross, John F. Radio Broadcasting Technology, 75 Years of Development in Australia 1923–1998 (J. F. Ross, 1998) 

Australian electrical engineers
1853 births
1915 deaths
People born at sea
People from Bendigo
Burials at Waverley Cemetery
People from Williamstown, Victoria
19th-century Australian inventors
Australian jewellers
Australian watchmakers (people)